Malfunkshun: The Andrew Wood Story is a 2005 documentary film produced and directed by Scot Barbour, based on the life of Andrew Wood, singer/songwriter for the Seattle-based alternative rock bands Malfunkshun and Mother Love Bone. The film includes interviews with fellow Seattle musicians and friends such as Chris Cornell, Kim Thayil, Jeff Ament, and Stone Gossard.

Wood died of a heroin overdose in 1990, just as Mother Love Bone were poised for commercial success. Upon Wood's death, two founding members of Mother Love Bone, along with Eddie Vedder, formed a band called Mookie Blaylock. However, they soon changed the band's name to Pearl Jam and became one of the most successful rock acts of the 1990s.

The film premiered at the Seattle International Film Festival. In October of the same year, the film was screened at the FAIF Film Festival in Hollywood, California.

References

External links
 

2005 films
2005 documentary films
American documentary films
Rockumentaries
Documentary films about singers
Documentary films about Seattle
2000s English-language films
2000s American films